Baglung District, a part of Gandaki Province, is one of the seventy-seven districts of Nepal.

Introduction
Baglung is surrounded by Parbat, Myagdi, Rukum, Rolpa, Pyuthan and Gulmi districts. It has 59 Village Development Committees and one Municipality. Baglung has a moniker of "District of suspension bridges" as there are numerous suspension bridges. It is a hilly district, most of the population settled in the sides of the rivers. Fertile plains situated in the either sides of the rivers are used for farming.  Headquarters of Baglung District is Baglung Municipality which is located on a plateau overlooking the holy Kali Gandaki. Like Nepal, Baglung is also diverse in religion, culture, ethnicity, altitude, temperature etc. Hinduism and Buddhism are the major religions.

Baglung is rich in herbal medicinal plants. Rice, Corn, Millet, Wheat and Potato are the major crops of Baglung. Small scale mining mostly for Iron and Copper was a major activity in Baglung in the past. However, due to economics of operating small mines most have closed since. Slate mining remains the most widespread form of mining in present times. Slate mined in Baglung is considered excellent for roofing.

Baglung Municipality, Hatiya- Galkot and Burtibang are the main trading centers of Baglung. Galkot, Kusma and Burtibang are connected with the district headquarters Baglung Bazaar by roads. Baglung is served by Nepal Electricity Authority and various small local hydropower plants. Recently, telephone has been accessible in almost all villages of Baglung. Baglung is considered to be one of the politically most conscious districts and it plays a significant role in the Nepali politics.

Geography and climate
Highest temperature at the lowest elevation of baglung rises up to about 37.5 degrees Celsius in summer and the lowest temperature at Dhorpatan falls up to about −15 degrees Celsius in winter. The elevation of Baglung varies from about 650 meters at Kharbang to about 4,300 meters in Dhorpatan.

Demographics
At the time of the 2011 Nepal census, Baglung District had a population of 268,613. Of these, 92.3% spoke Nepali, 5.5% Magar, 0.5% Chhantyal, 0.5% Kham, 0.5% Newar, 0.2% Tamang, 0.1% Bhojpuri, 0.1% Gurung, 0.1% Kumhali and 0.1% other languages as their first language.

In terms of ethnicity/caste, 28.1% were Magar, 19.5% Hill Brahmin, 18.6% Chhetri, 16.0% Kami, 5.6% Sarki, 4.7% Damai/Dholi, 1.5% Chhantyal, 1.4% Thakuri, 1.1% Newar, 0.7% Gurung, 0.6% Kumal, 0.4% Sanyasi/Dasnami, 0.3% Gharti/Bhujel, 0.3% Musalman, 0.2% Tamang,, 0.2% Thakali, 0.1% other Dalit, 0.1% Gaine, 0.1% Kayastha, 0.1% Majhi and 0.2% others.

In terms of religion, 89.3% were Hindu, 8.7% Buddhist, 0.7% Prakriti, 0.6% Christian, 0.3% Muslim and 0.4% others.

In terms of literacy, 71.7% could read and write, 2.6% could only read and 25.7% could neither read nor write.

Administration
The district consists of 10 Municipalities, out of which four are urban municipalities and six are rural municipalities. These are as follows:
Baglung Municipality (the district's headquarter)
Dhorpatan Municipality
Galkot Municipality
Jaimuni Municipality
Bareng Rural Municipality
Khathekhola Rural Municipality
Taman Khola Rural Municipality
Tara Khola Rural Municipality
Nisikhola Rural Municipality
Badigad Rural Municipality

Former Village Development Committees 
Prior to the restructuring of the district, Baglung consisted of the following municipalities and Village development committees:

Adhikarichaur
Amalachaur
Amarbhumi
Argal
Arjewa
Baglung Municipality
Baskot
Batakachaur
Bhakunde
Bhimgithe
Bhimpokhara
Bihunkot
Binamare
Boharagaun
Bowang

Bungadovan
Burtibang
Chhisti
Daga Tundada
Damek
Darling
Devisthan
Dhamja
Dhullu Baskot
Jaidi
Dudilavati
Gwalichaur-Harichaur
Hatiy
a
Hila
Hugdishir

Jaljala
Kandebas
Khungkhani
Khunga
Kusmishera
Lekhani
Malika
Malma
Mulpani
Narayansthan
Narethanti
Nisi
Paiyunthanthap
Palakot
Pandavkhani
Paiyunpata

Rajkut
Ranasingkiteni
Rangkhani
Rayadanda
Resha
Righa
Salyan
Sarkuwa
Singana
Sisakhani
Sukhaura
Sunkhani
Taman
Tangram
Tara
Tityang

2015 Nepal earthquake 
The district was moderately affected by an April 2015 Nepal earthquake. Many old buildings sustained damages and a few collapsed. Since then many of the buildings have been rebuilt by the owners.

See also 
Binhukot vdc

References

 
Districts of Nepal established in 1962
Gandaki Province